Larusso is a French singer.

Larusso or LaRusso may also refer to:

 Rudy LaRusso, basketball player
 Vincent LaRusso, American actor
 Daniel LaRusso, a fictional character who appears in The Karate Kid series

See also
 Laruso, English rock band

 Larus (disambiguation)